A.M. Weather was an American weather news program that ran from October 30, 1978 to February 3, 1995. and was broadcast on PBS member stations throughout the United States. The 15-minute daily program, which aired fifteen minutes before or after the hour (depending on the station's scheduling of the program) and was produced by Maryland Public Television (MPT, or before 1984 the Maryland Center for Public Broadcasting), featured detailed forecasts presented by meteorologists from the National Oceanic and Atmospheric Administration (NOAA). While many other media outlets embraced computer weather maps and graphics in the 1980s for weather forecasting use, A.M. Weather held back on fully embracing computer graphics until 1991, although they did adapt to such graphics for satellite and radar maps in the late 1980s. The show's trademark yellow pointer was a mainstay of the program entire run.

Overview
The show's progression usually started with a satellite and radar segment, followed by the current conditions around the U.S. (vice versa in early years), then the forecast (especially in terms of temperatures and precipitation), followed by an aviation forecast (locations of MVFR and IFR, aircraft icing, turbulence and winds aloft) and ended (when necessary) with an inclement weather report, called "WeatherWatch" (the only time that the yellow pointer was not used).

The program aired its final edition on February 3, 1995; one of the reasons behind A.M. Weathers cancellation was that MPT wanted to expand on its morning business news enterprise with Bloomberg L.P.

Hosts included NOAA meteorologists Carl Weiss, Joan von Ahn and Wayne Winston, as well as H. Michael Mogil, Rich Warren, Dale Bryan and Barry Richwein. Other notable substitute hosts included: Regis Walter, Steve Zubrick (now the president of the National Weather Association), Gary Petti (a meteorologist with National Weather Service and National Environmental Satellite, Data, and Information Service (NESDIS), now retired), and George Lessens (now the chief meteorologist at WZZM in Grand Rapids, Michigan).

Funding was provided by various aviation-related companies and government agencies, including the Federal Aviation Administration, the Aircraft Owners and Pilots Association (and its Air Safety Foundation arm), Phillips Petroleum Company, Gorman-Rupp pumps, Hilton Hotels Corporation, the National Business Aviation Association, Inc. (known at the time during the show's run as the National Business Aircraft Association), the Lawyer-Pilots Bar Association, Showalter Flying Services (a fixed-base operator in Orlando, Florida), Republic Airlines, and Beech Aircraft Corporation, Combs Gates, among others.

References

External links 
 
 WeatherBrains retrospective with interviews of Joan von Ahn and Carl Weiss

Weather forecasting
1978 American television series debuts
1980s American television news shows
1990s American television news shows
PBS original programming
English-language television shows